Baffin may refer to:

Places
 Qikiqtaaluk Region, also called the Baffin Region, an administrative and census region of Nunavut, Canada
 Baffin, Unorganized, part of the Baffin Region census division
 South Baffin, a territorial electoral district (riding) for the Legislative Assembly of Nunavut
 Baffin Island, an Arctic island of Nunavut
 Baffin Bay, a sea between the Atlantic and Arctic oceans
 Baffin Mountains, a mountain range running along the northeastern coast of Baffin Island
 Baffin Region, Northwest Territories, a region of the Northwest Territories prior to division
 Baffin Bay, Texas, a bay in South Texas, an inlet of the larger Laguna Madre

Other uses
 Baffin Island Current, an ocean current running south down the western side of Baffin Bay
 William Baffin, a 17th-century English navigator and discoverer
 , a World War II Isles class trawler of the Royal Canadian Navy
 Blackburn Baffin, a torpedo bomber of the Fleet Air Arm

See also 
 Baffins, an administrative district of Portsmouth, UK
 , a World War II escort carrier of the Royal Navy, formerly known as USS Baffins
 , a container ship